John Blake (born 1 November 1957) is an Irish former hurler who played as a left-corner back at senior level for the Cork county team.

Born in Mallow, County Cork, Blake first arrived on the inter-county scene at the age of twenty-three when he first linked up with the Cork senior team as a member of the extended panel for the 1981 championship. Blake later became a regular member of the starting fifteen over the next few years, and won three Munster medals. He won one All-Ireland medal as an unused substitute, as well as being an All-Ireland runner-up on two occasions.

At club level Blake won one Munster medal and five championship medals with St Finbarr's.

Throughout his career Blake made 9 championship appearances for Cork. He retired from inter-county hurling following the conclusion of the 1985 championship.

Honours
St Finbarr's
Munster Senior Club Hurling Championship (1): 1980
Cork Senior Hurling Championship (6): 1980, 1981, 1982, 1984, 1988, 1993

Cork
All-Ireland Senior Hurling Championship (1): 1984 (sub)
Munster Senior Hurling Championship (3): 1982, 1984, 1985

References

1957 births
Living people
St Finbarr's hurlers
Cork inter-county hurlers
People from Mallow, County Cork